The following is a list of the busiest airports in Brazil by aircraft movements (how busy the runways are) and passengers traffic (how busy the terminals are). For each airport, the lists cite the principal city associated with the airport, not (necessarily) the municipality where the airport is physically located. The tables consider only airports operated by Infraero, DAESP and Terminais Aéreos de Maringá - SBMG S.A.

In graph

2022

Brazil's busiest airports by passenger traffic

2021

Brazil's busiest airports by passenger traffic

2020

Brazil's busiest airports by passenger traffic

2019

Brazil's busiest airports by passenger traffic

2018

Brazil's busiest airports by passenger traffic

2017

Brazil's 50 busiest airports by passenger traffic

2016

Brazil's 40 busiest airports by passenger traffic

2015

Brazil's 40 busiest airports by passenger traffic

2014

Brazil's 40 busiest airports by passenger traffic

2013

Brazil's 40 busiest airports by passenger traffic

2012

Brazil's 25 busiest airports by aircraft movements- DAESP

2011

Brazil's 25 busiest airports by aircraft movements- Infraero 2011

2010

Brazil's 20 busiest airports by passenger traffic

2009

Brazil's 15 busiest airports by passenger traffic

2008

Brazil's 15 busiest airports by passenger traffic

2007

Brazil's 15 busiest airports by passenger traffic

2006

Brazil's 15 busiest airports by passenger traffic

2005

Brazil's 15 busiest airports by passenger traffic

2004

Brazil's 15 busiest airports by passenger traffic

See also
Infraero
DAESP

References

Br
Busiest

de:Liste der Verkehrsflughäfen in Südamerika#Brasilien